
Restaurant Chestnut is a restaurant in Ballydehob, West Cork, Ireland. It was awarded a Michelin star for 2019.

The restaurant is based in the former Chestnut Tree pub. The head chef is Rob Krawczyk, a native of Schull.

Awards
 Michelin star: since 2019

See also
List of Michelin starred restaurants in Ireland

References

External links
Official Site

Culture in County Cork
Michelin Guide starred restaurants in Ireland
Irish companies established in 2018